Sungei Tampines (Malay for Tampines River) is a river in Pasir Ris, Singapore. It is named for a type of tree that reportedly grew in the area, Streblus elongatus, commonly known as "tempinis" in Malay.

References

Rivers of Singapore